Alexandra Samuilovna Panafidina (1873-1919), was a book publisher from the Russian Empore. She was married to Andrei Yakovlevich Panafidin (1857-1902). She took over the book publication firm of her spouse in 1902, "Book Publication Firm and Book Company AS Panafidina." She and her husband played an important part among contemporary Russian book firms.

References
 25-летие книготорговой и издательской деятельности фирмы А. С. Панафидиной. /Книжный вестник, 1908, № 47.

Businesspeople from the Russian Empire
1873 births
1919 deaths
Book publishers (people) from the Russian Empire